Ratneshwar Lal Kayastha (born 3 May 1944) is a Nepalese politician and former Governor of Province No. 2. He was appointed as a governor of Province No. 2 by the Government of Nepal on 17 January 2018. He served as a Governor of Province No. 2 from 19 January 2018 to 03 November 2019.

Earlier, he was the Secretary at Ministry of Agriculture and Director General at Department of Irrigation, Nepal. Kayastha began his political career with Federal Socialist Forum, Nepal in the 2004.

Early life and education
Ratneshwar Lal Kayastha was born at Suga Bhawani (now Jaleshwar), Mahottari on 3 May 1944 to Lal Kishore Lal & Achakmani Devi. His father was a secondary level Teacher. He was passed School Leaving Certificate (SLC) in 1st division from Laxmi Chand Murarka Higher Secondary School in Jaleshwar and earned an Intermediates degree with Science from Tri-Chandra College, Kathmandu. He further studied Bachelor of Technology (B. Tech.) from the same college and later he moved to IIT, Kharaghpur and Imperial College London for higher education degree.

Civil service career
Kayastha joined Civil services of Nepal as an Engineer in 1964.

See also
 Prof. Dr. Govinda Bahadur Tumbahang
 Anuradha Koirala
 Baburam Kunwar
 Durga Keshar Khanal
Mohan Raj Malla

References

External links

Living people
1944 births
Nepalese politicians
IIT Kharagpur alumni
Alumni of Imperial College London
People from Mahottari District
Governors of Madhesh Province
Tri-Chandra College alumni